Mark Nash may refer to:
 Mark Nash (basketball) (born 1976), Australian basketball player
 Mark Nash (murderer), Irish serial killer
 Mark Nash (musician), drummer for Christian rock band PFR